is a train station on the Hankyu Railway Senri Line located in Suita, Osaka Prefecture, Japan.

Layout

There are two side platforms with two tracks on the ground level.

History

October 26, 1921 –  on Kita-Osaka Railway was opened.
April 17, 1922 –  was opened between the Kadan-mae Station and the Senriyama Station.
April 1, 1923 – Kadan-mae Station and Daigaku-mae Station became stations on Shin-Keihan Railway.
September 15, 1930 – Kadan-mae Station and Daigaku-mae Station became new stations on the Keihan Railway (old) Senriyama Line.
September 15, 1938 – Kadan-mae Station was renamed .
October 1, 1943 – Hanshin Kyuko Railway Company consolidated Keihan Railway Company (old) and was renamed Keihanshin Kyuko Railway Company, thus Kadan-mae Station and Daigaku-mae Station became stations on the Keihanshin Kyuko Railway Senriyama Line.
December 1, 1943 – Senriyama-yūen Station was renamed .
April 7, 1946 – Senriyama-kōseien Station was renamed  again.
August 1, 1950 – Senriyama-yūen Station was renamed .
March 1, 1967 – The Senriyama Line was renamed the Senri Line.

Surrounding
Kansai University, at the Senriyama Campus

Stations next to Kandai-mae

External links
 Kandai-mae Station from Hankyu Railway website

Railway stations in Japan opened in 1964
Railway stations in Osaka Prefecture